Ronald Walford Todd (23 October 1916 – 8 February 1991) was an Australian rules footballer who played for the Collingwood Football Club in the Victorian Football League (VFL) and the Williamstown Football Club in the Victorian Football Association (VFA). Renowned for his high marking and goalkicking ability, Todd was considered as the logical successor to the legendary Gordon Coventry, but his controversial move to Williamstown, along with teammate and friend Des Fothergill, caused much bitterness at Collingwood for many years afterward. He holds the record for the most goals kicked in a VFA season (188), and his 23 goals in the 1939 VFL finals series stood as a record until it was broken by Gary Ablett Sr. in 1989.

VFL career
Todd debuted for Collingwood in 1935 and joined Gordon Coventry in the forward line. For his first three seasons Todd played at centre half forward but moved into the goalsquare when Coventry retired at the end of 1937. He had an immediate impact, kicking 102 goals in the 1938 home and away season before adding 18 more in the finals. In a game during that season against Carlton Todd kicked 11.5 yet ended up on the losing team. In another game, against Richmond, Todd kicked 7 goals and 12 points, as well as kicking out of bounds on the full five times. His season tally was the highest in the league and Todd again topped the league in 1939 VFL season, this time finishing with 121 goals.

His 1939 finals total of 23 goals was not bettered until Gary Ablett kicked 27 in the 1989 series. In the last home-and-away round against Richmond Todd brought up his 300th career goal, his 73 games equalled Bob Pratt's record for fewest games required to reach the milestone.

VFA career
Todd's VFL career ended when he signed up to play under throw-pass rules with VFA club Williamstown just before the 1940 season kicked off. Todd actually signed not with the club but with Williamstown Vice President, William John (Bill) Dooley; his wage at Williamstown was £500 flat plus £5 per game on a three-year contract. Williamstown had sold membership tickets on the basis of the attraction of having Todd and Harry Vallence in the same side.

Todd played at centre-half forward in his first season with Williamstown and booted 99 goals, and when the Victorian Football Association (VFA) went into recess in 1942, Todd joined the air force. Despite an interest in returning to Collingwood (whose fortunes had declined abruptly since Todd left) when he spent some time in Melbourne on leave, a three-year VFL ban due to his crossing without a clearance made any return to the Magpies during the war impossible.

When the VFA resumed competition in 1945, Todd moved to full-forward and kicked a record 188 goals for the season which still stands today, including 20 goals in a game against Oakleigh.

In 1945, Todd also kicked 57 goals for an RAAF team in Sunday competition during the season, and after the VFA season finished, kicked nine goals for the RAAF in a match against a North Tasmania team and 16 goals for a combined Williamstown/Coburg team on a two match tour of Broken Hill, bringing his overall total for the year to 270 goals from 41 games.

At Williamstown, Todd played 141 games for 672 goals, in the process playing in premiership sides in 1945 and 1949. In all, he played 217 games at Collingwood and Williamstown and kicked 999 goals. If his matches for Victoria, his 1942–1945 RAAF games and three tour games (the third was in Tasmania in 1946) are considered, then he played 274 matches and kicked 1238 goals in his overall career.

Hotelier
After his retirement, Todd moved into business in 1951 by purchasing the Hotel Pacific in Lorne.

He later moved to the Gold Coast in Queensland, and died in 1991.

Cricket
During his career, Todd was also a proficient district cricketer for Northcote during the summers, playing 117 first XI games over twelve seasons, taking 204 wickets with his leg breaks and averaging 33.6 with the bat.

Posthumous recognition
In 1997, Todd was initially selected in the Collingwood Team of the Century, but was removed when one of the selectors, John McHale, son of legendary Collingwood coach Jock, objected to his inclusion in the ceremonial team. In 2017, he was inducted into the Australian Football Hall of Fame.

In 2007, Todd was back in the news when Carlton centre-half back Bert Deacon's 1947 Brownlow Medal was found in his old shop.

In 2011 Todd was posthumously inducted into the Collingwood Hall of Fame.

Footnotes

References

 Atkinson, G. (1982). Everything you ever wanted to know about Australian rules football but couldn't be bothered asking, The Five Mile Press: Melbourne. .
 Renn, Ronald Percy, "Renn looks on Saturday's games", The Age, (Monday, 26 April 1937), p.6.
 Lacy, H.A., "Morally Bound to Williamstown: Champion Forward Worried by Legal Viewpoints", The Sporting Globe, (Wednesday, 17 April 1940), p.1.
 Todd, Ron (as told to Jim Blake), "Todd Won't Play on for Just One Goal: Record Stays Put at 999", The Sporting Globe, (Wednesday, 29 March 1950), p.16.
 Todd, Ron (as told to Jim Blake), "These Were the Champions in My Day", The Sporting Globe, (Wednesday, 5 April 1950), p.13.
 Todd, Ron (as told to Jim Blake), "Advice to Young Footballers", The Sporting Globe, (Wednesday, 12 April 1950), p.14.
 Todd, Ron (as told to Jim Blake), "Footballers Grossly Underpaid says Ron Todd: Story of Transfer", The Sporting Globe, (Wednesday, 19 April 1950), p.13.
 Todd, Ron (as told to Jim Blake), "Ron Todd Tells of His Greatest Football Thrills: 188 Goals: One Season", The Sporting Globe, (Wednesday, 26 April 1950), p.13.

External links
 
 
 Ron Todd, at The VFA Project.
 Ron Todd, at Boyles Football Photos.
 Ron Todd's 188 Goals in a Season, at Boyles Football Photos.
 Ron Todd, at Collingwood Forever.

1916 births
1991 deaths
Australian rules footballers from Victoria (Australia)
Collingwood Football Club players
Collingwood Football Club Premiership players
Williamstown Football Club players
VFL Leading Goalkicker Medal winners
Australian Football Hall of Fame inductees
Royal Australian Air Force personnel of World War II
One-time VFL/AFL Premiership players